Dmitri Igorevich Podshivalov (born 18 January 1981) is a former Russian football player.

External links
 

1981 births
Footballers from Moscow
Living people
Russian footballers
Association football forwards
Russian Premier League players
FC Dynamo Moscow players
FC Arsenal Tula players